The Albanian Archdiocese, also known as the Albanian Orthodox Archdiocese in America, is one of three ethnic dioceses of the Orthodox Church in America (OCA). Its territory includes parishes, and missions located in seven states in the United States – California, Connecticut, Massachusetts, Michigan, New York, Ohio, and Pennsylvania.

Establishment
The earliest organized Albanian dioceses were set up under the auspices of the Russian Orthodox Greek Catholic Church in America (now Orthodox Church in America), because the Church of Constantinople would not allow the rise of any Albanian Orthodox Church and officially opposed the use of the Albanian language in churches until 1937 when the Autocephalic Orthodox Church of Albania was recognized by Constantinople.

On March 18, 1908, as a result of the Hudson Incident, Fan Noli was ordained as a priest by a Russian bishop in the United States. In March 1908, Noli thus led the first time in Albanian the Orthodox liturgy for the Albanian-American community. 
After political dislocations following the October Revolution of 1917 in Russia, all ties with the Russian Orthodox church were severed, and the Albanian churches under Noli became independent.

After World War II, following the controversies about Noli's status, and the political divergences of Albanian-Americans with the rise of Communism in Albania, Patriarch of Constantinople, Athenagoras, to send a canonical bishop, the Rt. Rev. Mark (Lipa) who organized the diocese in 1949–1950 and accepted into it the considerable community in Chicago and an older parish, the first of three Albanian Orthodox parishes to locate in South Boston.
Ten other Albanian Orthodox parishes incorporated under Bp. Theofan's Archdiocese and two parishes persisted in an "independent" status. By October 1971, with the acceptance of Bp. Stephen and the Albanian Orthodox Archdiocese in America as a constituent diocese of the OCA, the canonical controversy was ended. Meanwhile, the Albanian Orthodox Diocese of America founded by Lipa continued under the jurisdiction of the Church of Constantinople affiliate with the Greek Orthodox Church in America.

Bishop

The last bishop of the archdiocese was the Right Reverend Nikon (Liolin), who was elected to the position of Bishop of Boston and the Albanian Archdiocese on October 22, 2003.  He was later installed as Bishop of Boston, New England, and the Albanian Archdiocese on December 18, 2005, reflecting his election by the Holy Synod to simultaneously head the OCA's Diocese of New England which is based in Hartford, Connecticut. Archbishop Nikon died on September 1, 2019. On September 10, 2019, the OCA announced that Metropolitan Tikhon (Mollard) will be the locum tenens for the diocese until a successor is found.

Annual Convention
The Annual Convention is the supreme legislative and administrative authority in all secular matters of the archdiocese. It is composed of the bishop, the clergy of the archdiocese, and lay delegates representing each parish within the jurisdiction of the Albanian Orthodox Archdiocese in America.

Deaneries
The diocese is grouped geographically into three deaneries, each consisting of a number of parishes.  Each deanery is headed by a parish priest, known as a dean.  The deans coordinate activities in their area's parishes, and report to the diocesan bishop.  The current deaneries of the Albanian Archdiocese and their territories are:

 Great Lakes Deanery – Michigan, New York, and Ohio
 Massachusetts Deanery – California and Massachusetts
 Mid-Atlantic Deanery – Connecticut, New York, and Pennsylvania

See also
Albanian Orthodox Diocese of America
Albanian Orthodox Church

References

Notes and references
 Official site of the Diocese of New England
 Biography on oca.org
 2005 interview with Bishop Nikon

Albanian-American history
Albanian
Eastern Orthodoxy in California
Eastern Orthodoxy in Connecticut
Eastern Orthodoxy in Massachusetts
Eastern Orthodoxy in Michigan
Eastern Orthodoxy in New York (state)
Eastern Orthodoxy in Ohio
Eastern Orthodoxy in Pennsylvania
Organizations based in Boston
Christianity in Boston
Eastern Orthodoxy in Albania
Eastern Orthodox organizations established in the 20th century
Christian organizations established in 1908
1908 establishments in the United States